Alatriste is a 2006 Spanish epic historical fiction war film directed by Agustín Díaz Yanes, based on the main character of a series of novels written by Arturo Pérez-Reverte, The Adventures of Captain Alatriste.

The film, which stars Viggo Mortensen, is the second most expensive Spanish language film ever made in Spain (about €24 million – US$30 million); only preceded by Agora. It portrays Spain of the 17th century using both fictional and real characters. Twentieth Century Fox has bought the rights to the film.

The film was released on 1 September 2006.

Plot
The story takes place during the 17th century in the Spanish Empire. Diego Alatriste is a soldier in the service of King Philip IV of Spain during the Eighty Years' War. The story begins in the Spanish Netherlands, where his tercio fights in the Dutch Revolt. His friend Lope Balboa is killed during the fighting, and Alatriste returns to Madrid where he takes Lope's young son Íñigo into his care.

Alatriste is hired along with a Sicilian assassin named Gualterio Malatesta to kill the Prince of Wales (the future King Charles I of England) and his companion, the Duke of Buckingham. The job is contracted by Emilio Bocanegra and Luis de Alquézar (uncle of Íñigo's love interest, Angélica de Alquézar). Alatriste finally returns to the Netherlands in 1624 (although the movie states 1625) and participates in the final battles leading to Breda's surrender. After returning to Spain, Íñigo wants to elope with Angélica, but she gets cold feet at the last moment. Alatriste has a romance with actress María de Castro. Because she was disappointed that she failed to marry him, she became the lover of Philip IV. Alatriste ends up crossing swords with Guadalmedina, a friend of the king. In the end, the object of their attention falls ill with syphilis. The duel with his friend Martín Saldaña and the punishment of Íñigo in the galleys are part of the film's spectacular ending.

The last scenes are at the Battle of Rocroi (May 1643), described in the last book of The Adventures of Captain Alatriste saga. During the battle, Abel Moreno Gómez's "La Madrugá" is playing as the defeated army's march and this is where it is assumed that Alatriste dies.

The plot of the film has elements from each of the five books published up to the premiere, and it maintains the same storyline for the main characters. It includes excerpts from the future books of the saga.

Cast

Antonio Resines, originally slated to appear as Saldaña, almost retired from the entire movie due to a traffic accident; however, he makes a cameo appearance in the Battle of Rocroi as a musketeer officer.

Awards and nominations

|-
| align = "center" rowspan = "17" | 2007 || 12th Forqué Award || colspan = "2" | Best Film ||  || 
|-
| rowspan = "15" | 21st Goya Awards || colspan = "2" | Best Film ||  || rowspan = "15" | 
|-
| Best Actor || Viggo Mortensen ||  
|-
| Best Director || Agustín Díaz Yanes || 
|-
| Best Adapted Screenplay || Agustín Díaz Yanes || 
|-
| Best Supporting Actor || Juan Echanove || 
|-
| Best Supporting Actress || Ariadna Gil || 
|-
| Best Production Supervision || Cristina Zumárraga || 
|-
| Best Original Score || Roque Baños || 
|-
| Best Art Direction  || Benjamín Fernández || 
|-
| Best Costume Design || Francesca Sartori || 
|-
| Best Cinematography ||  || 
|-
| Best Editing || José Salcedo || 
|-
| Best Makeup and Hairstyles || José Luis Pérez || 
|-
| Best Sound || Dominique Hennequin, Patrice Grisolet, Pierre Gamet || 
|-
| Best Special Effects || Reyes Abades, Rafael Solorzano || 
|-
| 16th Actors and Actresses Union Awards || Best Film Actor in a Minor Role || Javier Cámara ||  || 
|}

References

External links 

 
Official Arturo Pérez-Reverte's website 

2006 films
2000s historical drama films
2000s war drama films
2000s action drama films
Films based on historical novels
Films based on military novels
Films based on romance novels
Films based on Spanish novels
Films based on works by Arturo Pérez-Reverte
Films set in the 17th century
Films set in Spain
Films set in the Netherlands
Films shot in Madrid
Spanish action drama films
Historical action films
Spanish epic films
Spanish historical drama films
Spanish war drama films
2000s Spanish-language films
Spanish swashbuckler films
Films scored by Roque Baños
Films directed by Agustín Díaz Yanes
2006 drama films
Films produced by Álvaro Augustin
Works based on Spanish novels
2000s Spanish films